3581 Alvarez, provisional designation , is a carbonaceous asteroid and a very large Mars-crosser on an eccentric orbit from the asteroid belt, approximately  in diameter. It was discovered on 23 April 1985, by American astronomer couple Carolyn and Eugene Shoemaker at the Palomar Observatory in California. The likely spherical B-type asteroid has a rotation period of 33.4 hours. It was named for scientists Luis Alvarez and his son Walter Alvarez.

Orbit and classification 

Alvarez is a Mars-crossing asteroid, a dynamically unstable group between the main belt and the near-Earth populations, crossing the orbit of Mars at 1.66 AU. However, due to the high inclination of its orbit, it never actually passes through the orbit of Mars since at perihelion it is well away from Mars' orbital plane. It orbits the Sun at a distance of 1.7–3.9 AU once every 4 years and 7 months (1,689 days; semi-major axis of 2.78 AU). Its orbit has an eccentricity of 0.41 and an inclination of 29° with respect to the ecliptic.

Naming 

This minor planet was named after planetary scientist Walter Alvarez (born 1940) and his Nobel-prize winning father, physicist Luis Walter Alvarez (1911–1988). Both at University of California, Berkeley, they are best known for the discovery of a global geochemical anomaly of noble metals at the K-T boundary, which led to hypothesis that the dinosaurs were killed by an asteroid impact (also see Alvarez hypothesis). The official  was published by the Minor Planet Center on 2 February 1988, just a few months after the naming was announcement on the occasion of the second Conference on Global Catastrophes in Earth History, held in October 1987 at Snowbird, Utah.

Physical characteristics 

In the SMASS classification, Alvarez is a carbonaceous B-type asteroid, somewhat "brighter" than the more common C-type asteroids.

Rotation period 

In September 2004, a rotational lightcurve of Alvarez was obtained from photometric observations by American photometrist William Koff at the Antelope Hills Observatory  in Bennett, Colorado. Lightcurve analysis gave a longer-than-average rotation period of  hours with a small brightness amplitude of  magnitude, indicative of a spherical rather than elongated shape. The result supersedes a previous period determination by Wiesław Wiśniewski from 1990, which gave a period of at least 24 hours.

Diameter and albedo 

According to the survey carried out by the NEOWISE mission of NASA's Wide-field Infrared Survey Explorer, Alvarez measures 13.69 kilometers in diameter and its surface has an albedo of 0.113. Previously published WISE data from 2013 and 2016 gave a concurring diameter of 14 and 13.7 kilometer with an albedo of 0.14 and 0.13, respectively. The Collaborative Asteroid Lightcurve Link assumes an albedo of 0.057 and derives a diameter of 18.43 kilometers based on an absolute magnitude of 12.4.

With a diameter close to 14 kilometers, Alvarez is larger than most sizeable Mars-crossing asteroids such as 1065 Amundsenia (9.75 km), 1139 Atami (9.35 km), 1011 Laodamia (7.39 km), 1727 Mette (5.44 km), 1131 Porzia (7.13 km), 1235 Schorria (5.55 km), 985 Rosina (8.18 km) and 1468 Zomba (7 km), comparable with 1310 Villigera (15.24 km) and 1474 Beira (15.46 km), but still smaller than the largest members of this dynamical group, namely, 132 Aethra, 323 Brucia (former Mars-crosser), 1508 Kemi, 2204 Lyyli and 512 Taurinensis, which are larger than 20 kilometers in diameter in at least one of the publications.

Notes

References

External links 
 Asteroid Lightcurve Database (LCDB), query form (info )
 Dictionary of Minor Planet Names, Google books
 Discovery Circumstances: Numbered Minor Planets (1)-(5000) – Minor Planet Center
 
 

003581
Discoveries by Eugene Merle Shoemaker
Discoveries by Carolyn S. Shoemaker
Named minor planets
003581
19850423